House of Meetings, by Martin Amis, is a 2006 novel about two brothers who share a common love interest while living in a Soviet gulag during the last decade of Stalin's rule. This novel was written by Amis during a two-year-long self-imposed exile in Uruguay following the release and tepid reception afforded to his 2003 novel Yellow Dog. The writing of House of Meetings "precipitated (another) creative crisis" for Amis, which Amis reflected upon in 2010:

"You see those Posy Simmonds cartoons of people by the pool having cocktails and saying into the Dictaphone, 'On the second day, the last child died,'" he says. "And I was in Uruguay, with my beautiful wife and beautiful daughters, living a completely stressless life. So I had to do my suffering on the page and, Christ, did I do it. I was very nervous about that book."

Plot summary 
The novel centers on the modern-day (2004) recollections of the unnamed narrator/protagonist of his time spent in an Arctic gulag and the years that followed. The recollections are presented in the form of a memoir sent to the narrator's American stepdaughter, Venus. One of the primary plot elements is the complex relationship between the protagonist and his younger half-brother, Lev, who later joins him in the camp. Through many difficult revelations and trials, they eventually survive the harsh conditions of the camp and then must face a further challenge: re–acclimatizing to everyday life.

Literary significance and criticism
The novel's release was greeted with generally positive reviews; see, e.g., [[The Economist|The Economist'''s]] October review.

Footnotes

External links
"Breath was just another weapon": a review in the TLS by Bharat Tandon, September 2006.
Tom Chatfield writes on Amis's House of Meetings for Prospect Magazine''

Further reading
 

 

 

2006 British novels
Novels by Martin Amis
Books with cover art by Chip Kidd
Novels set in Siberia
Novels set in the Gulag
Jonathan Cape books